Despinis eton 39 or Despinis eton 39 ( A 39-year-old Lady) is a 1954 Greek drama-comedy film directed by Alekos Sakellarios and starring Vassilis Logothetidis, Smaro Stefanidou and Ilya Livykou.

Plot
It starts for a classical theme of his brother/sister? which he cannot get married unless he first restore his brother.  In this, the downfall of a great person, loved by a younger lady which he absolutely to torn as an extreme between these messages about the marriage.  In order to hide her real age of the sister which she present as a 39 year old lady (as does as the movie title).  Later on, these different tragic comedy situations in which planned to failed.  The movie returned again by the same director in 1968 with Lambros Konstantaras in O Romios ehi filotimo

Cast

Vasilis Logothetidis - Tilemahos Karadaris
Smaro Stefanidou - Hrysanthi Karadari
Ilya Livykou - Fofo
Vangelis Protopapas - Kriton Stefanis
Stefanos Stratigos - Rokas
Thanasis Tzeneralis - Stamatis

See also
List of Greek films
Greek films of the 1950s

External links

Desp(o)inis eton 39 at cine.gr 

1954 films
1954 comedy-drama films
1950s Greek-language films
Films shot in Egypt
Greek comedy-drama films
Greek black-and-white films